Mizhigli (Kaitag: Мижигъла; Dargwa: Мижгъели) is a rural locality (a selo) in Shilyaginsky Selsoviet, Kaytagsky District, Republic of Dagestan, Russia. The population was 382 as of 2010. There are 21 streets.

Geography 
Mizhigli is located 7 km southwest of Madzhalis (the district's administrative centre) by road. Dzhigiya, Shilyagi and Kulidzha are the nearest rural localities.

Nationalities 
Dargins live there.

References 

Rural localities in Kaytagsky District